Witness: The Tour was the fourth concert tour by American singer Katy Perry, in support of her fifth studio album, Witness (2017). The tour began on September 19, 2017, in Montreal, Canada, and concluded on August 21, 2018, in Auckland, New Zealand. Perry visited North America, South America, Asia, Europe, Africa and Oceania.

At the end of 2017, the tour placed at number 77 on Pollstars "2017 Year-End Top 100 Worldwide Tours" list, estimating that it grossed $28.1 million and that 266,300 people attended throughout the year. In July 2018, Pollstar ranked the tour on number 14 at the Mid Year Top 100 Worldwide Tours 2018 with $48.8 million and 577,617 of tickets sold in 54 shows. In December 2018, Pollstar ranked the tour at number 29 with $55.3 million gross and 633,827 tickets sold in 52 shows. According to Billboard, the full tour grossed an average of $1.08 million while selling 11,560 tickets per show.

Development 

Perry first announced on May 15, 2017, that her fifth album Witness would be released on June 9, 2017, and that she would embark on Witness: The Tour in support of it. Copies of the album are included along with the purchased tickets. During the North American leg of the tour, one dollar from each ticket purchased will go to the Boys & Girls Clubs of America, and fans will also have a chance to win free tickets by doing volunteer work for that organization via Global Citizen. The tour was originally scheduled to begin in Columbus on September 7, 2017. However, Perry revealed on August 17, that due to production delays, the tour had been rescheduled to begin on September 19, 2017. She also announced that Noah Cyrus, Purity Ring and Carly Rae Jepsen would respectively serve as opening acts from September 19 to November 1; November 7 to December 20; and January 5, 2018, to February 5, 2018. The singer later added a final Canadian date for February 6 with Jepsen.

On June 2, 2017, a week prior the release of Witness, European dates were announced. An extra date for London, Amsterdam, Paris as well as dates in Barcelona and Lisbon (this one part of the Rock In Rio festival) were later added. On March 6, 2018, Perry announced that Tove Styrke and Hailee Steinfeld will be the opening acts in Europe. Styrke will open the shows from May 23 until June 10, while Steinfeld from June 14 to June 28.

In July 2017, it was revealed that the tour will then visit Oceania from July 2018 to August 2018. In July 2017, three additional Australian dates were added following popular demand, resulting in 14 shows scheduled during the leg. On May 9, 2018, Perry announced two more shows, one in Adelaide and one in Sydney.

In October 2017, she announced three concerts in Mexico the following May taking place on the 3rd, 8th, and 11th. An additional concert for the country in Monterrey was added for May 9 after the first one sold out, and another show in Mexico City was added the following month for Mexico City on May 4. Other dates in Latin America were later added to the itinerary, including shows in Brazil, Chile, Argentina and Peru.

Perry also visited Asia between March and April 2018 and Africa in July 2018.

Witness: Coming Home
On March 13, 2018, Perry announced Witness: Coming Home, a benefit concert that will be held in her hometown of Santa Barbara, California, which will benefit those who are still recovering from the aftermath of the 2017 California wildfires and 2018 Southern California mudflows. Perry partnered with the Santa Barbara Foundation, the 93108 Fund and The 805 UndocuFund, which all help in assisting members of the community in the Santa Barbara area through grants and various philanthropic efforts.

Concert synopsis 

The show was divided into five segments—Manifesto, Retrospective, Sexual Discovery, Introspective, Emergence—and concluded with an encore. Shortly before the show begins, the stage's eye-shaped screen displays a video of Perry's eye for a few moments. The eye transforms into a galaxy and a journey through outer space is shown, leading to a red-colored planet. The screen opens to reveal Perry riding upon a star-shaped structure, wearing a bejeweled and hooded red outfit with sunglasses. She performs the chorus of "Witness", followed by "Roulette" which she sings on top of giant climbable dice. "Dark Horse" is then sung, with Perry and her dancers atop of moving platforms. Perry performs "Chained to the Rhythm" next, with large puppets dressed in suits and sporting televisions for heads moving around the stage. A video interlude is played that shows a clock running backward alongside childhood photos of Perry, as her backing singers perform portions of "Act My Age". Perry emerges wearing a pantsuit with a grid design, while her dancers wear shape-themed outfits. "Teenage Dream" is performed, which culminates in Perry and her dancers performing synchronized choreography while sitting on a floating cuboid. Perry removes her jacket to reveal an LED top that displays the lyrics of "Hot n Cold" as Perry performs the song with an electric guitar. "Hot n Cold" transitions into "Last Friday Night (T.G.I.F.)", which Perry and her backing singers perform at the front of the stage. Puppets in the shape of flamingos are guided around the stage by dancers during this number. Perry's female dancers wear paper doll cut-outs of her most memorable outfits during "California Gurls", and she is also joined by the Left Shark that featured in her Super Bowl XLIX halftime show. Perry and the Left Shark then typically bring out an oversized telephone, with which Perry calls someone close to her, such as her parents. Giant lips emerge from behind the stage, which Perry is lifted inside while performing "I Kissed a Girl".

An interlude is played, which features Perry floating through space. The stage is adorned with huge roses, and Perry emerges wearing a black-and-white, polka dot latex outfit. She performs "Déjà Vu", followed by "Tsunami", during which she dances on a rotating pole. Venus flytrap props are added to the stage, and Perry sings "E.T." as she is joined onstage by a dancer in stilts, dressed as an alien insect. "Bon Appétit" is performed next. Towards the end of the song, jeweled flies are attached to Perry's costume and she lies on a leaf, while dancers pour glitter on her from oversized salt and pepper shakers. The performance samples a portion of Janet Jackson's song "What Have You Done for Me Lately", which Perry performs with her backing singers. Perry exits the stage for a short time, while multi-colored planets descend from the venue's ceiling, and Perry emerges from a planet wearing a crystal-covered gown and wig. She sings "Thinking of You" / "Wide Awake" with an acoustic guitar as the planet she is sitting on flies around the venue. After performing "Save as Draft", Perry then moves to the Drop Zone, an area of the stage in which she is closest to fans. She invites a fan to join her on stage before singing "Power", at the end of which Perry is given angel wings.

The next segment of the show is introduced with a video interlude showing Perry wearing a motorcycle helmet. She appears from behind the stage riding a motorcycle and wearing a striped blue outfit, and performs "Hey Hey Hey", followed by "Part of Me". A huge basketball net appears on stage for "Swish Swish", which Perry sings alongside dancers holding inflatable basketballs. Perry interrupts the song to hold an impromptu basketball game, during which she competes against a father of a young attendee from the audience. She finishes the song joined by her dancers on trampolines. "Roar" is performed next, while a large lion's head emerges from behind the screen. Perry returns to sing "Firework" for the encore, which she performs wearing a sequined purple gown on top of a hand that rises from beneath the stage. Fireworks erupt on stage during the number. At the end of the song, the hand closes up with Perry inside as she ends the show.

Critical reception 
Jon Caramanica from The New York Times said that the show was "game, wacky, mildly overcompensatory" with an "impeccable" set design, although he thought that the "new material" Perry performed was "among her weakest". He praised Perry's onstage charisma and despite he thought that her live vocals were often "low in the mix", he complimented the acoustic performances when the singer sat down and played on a guitar. Jeffrey Lee Puckett from USA Today praised the visuals of the show, including the "non-stop blur of explosive lights, video, huge puppets, dancers, giant basketball goals, confetti and robot Venus flytraps". However, he felt the setlist was a "less successful" aspect of the show, adding "Perry's new songs from her Witness album don't have the sharpness or pop exuberance of her older material, instead just kind of sliding into a generic beat-per-minute muddle." Jordan Zivitz from the Montreal Gazette said that "extra production time could have been used to adjust some visuals whose juxtapositions and statements were as confused as they were colourful", but complimented Perry's stage presence, adding that "the energy was certainly there, with the singer staying in constant motion on a multi-stage set for two hours."

Commercial performance
At the end of 2017, the tour placed at number 77 on Pollstars "2017 Year-End Top 100 Worldwide Tours" list, estimating that it grossed $28.1 million and that 266,300 people attended throughout the year. The tour is the third best-selling female tour in the United Kingdom in 2018, according to StubHub, only behind Taylor Swift and Britney Spears.

Set list 
 
This set list is from the show on January 19, 2018, in Glendale. It is not intended to represent all concerts for the tour.

"Witness" / "Roulette"
"Dark Horse"
"Chained to the Rhythm"
"Act My Age" (interlude)
"Teenage Dream" 
"Hot n Cold" / "Last Friday Night (T.G.I.F.)" 
"California Gurls"
"I Kissed a Girl"
"Déjà Vu"
"Tsunami"
"E.T."
"Bon Appétit" (contains elements of "What Have You Done for Me Lately")
"Mind Maze" (interlude)
"Wide Awake"
"Thinking of You"
"Power"
"Part of Me"
"Swish Swish"
"Roar"
Encore
"Firework"

Notes
 "Wide Awake" was not performed during the first shows. Moreover, on selected dates, Perry performed "Save as Draft" and "Hey Hey Hey" before "Power" and "Part of Me" respectively.
 On October 6, 2017 in New York City, Perry performed an acoustic version of "Part of Me" before "Power", rather than later in the show as a dedication to her fans for coming after the 2017 Las Vegas shooting.
 On selected dates in South America, Perry performed "Unconditionally" in place of "Thinking of You". Moreover, during the concert in Rio de Janeiro, Perry dedicated the performance of "Power" to Marielle Franco, who died the week before, and called Franco's relatives onstage to express her condolences.
 From the first show in Saitama onwards, Perry performed "Into Me You See" in place of "Thinking of You".
 On selected dates, Perry performed "Pendulum" before "Firework", as part of the encore.
 On June 22, 2018 in Manchester, Perry performed "By the Grace of God" in place of "Into Me You See" as a dedication to the city due to the Manchester Arena bombing. She also dedicated "Firework" to the 22 victims of the attack.
 On June 28, 2018 in Barcelona, Perry performed a cover of "One of Us" by Joan Osborne in place of "Into Me You See".

Tour dates

Cancelled shows

References

Notes

Citations

External links 

 #WitnessTheFuture with Boys and Girls Clubs of America at KatyPerry.com

Katy Perry concert tours
2017 concert tours
2018 concert tours
Concert tours of North America
Concert tours of the United States
Concert tours of Canada
Concert tours of Europe
Concert tours of the United Kingdom
Concert tours of France
Concert tours of Germany
Concert tours of Oceania
Concert tours of Australia
Concert tours of New Zealand